The 2021 Pac-12 Conference women's basketball tournament, presented by New York Life, was a postseason tournament held March 3–7, 2021, at Michelob Ultra Arena on the Las Vegas Strip in Paradise, Nevada. Stanford won its 14th Pac-12 title, receiving a bid to the 2021 NCAA tournament.

Seeds

Schedule

Bracket
Note: * denotes overtime

All-Tournament Team
Source:

Most Outstanding Player

See also
 2021 Pac-12 Conference men's basketball tournament

References

External links
Official website – Pac-12 Conference women's basketball tournament

Tournament
Pac-12 Conference women's basketball tournament
Pac-12
Women's sports in Nevada
2021 in sports in Nevada
College basketball tournaments in Nevada
College sports tournaments in Nevada